Spoofer McGraw was a British comic strip, drawn by Gordon Bell, which ran in the British comics magazines Sparky and The Topper from 1968 to 1974.

Concept

Spoofer McGraw is a young boy who, as his name implies, enjoys playing spoofs and pranks on others. He would tell lengthy and completely made up explanations to answer questions sent in by readers of the magazine. His sidekick, Bo, was a young boy who played the straight man to his outlandish comments.

Sources

British comic strips
DC Thomson Comics strips
1968 comics debuts
1974 comics endings
Comics characters introduced in 1968
McGraw
McGraw
Gag-a-day comics
McGraw
British comics characters